Fishtrap Lake State Park is a park located southeast of Pikeville, Kentucky in Pike County. The park opened to the public in 2003.

References

State parks of Kentucky
Protected areas of Pike County, Kentucky
Protected areas established in 2003
2003 establishments in Kentucky